The 1919 Tour de France was the 13th edition of Tour de France, one of cycling's Grand Tours. The Tour began in Paris with a flat stage on 29 June, and Stage 8 occurred on 13 July with a flat stage to Marseille. The race finished in Paris on 27 July.

Stage 1
29 June 1919 — Paris to Le Havre,

Stage 2
1 July 1919 — Le Havre to Cherbourg-en-Cotentin,

Stage 3
3 July 1919 — Cherbourg-en-Cotentin to Brest,

Stage 4
5 July 1919 — Brest to Les Sables-d'Olonne,

Stage 5
7 July 1919 — Les Sables-d'Olonne to Bayonne,

Stage 6
9 July 1919 — Bayonne to Luchon,

Stage 7
11 July 1919 — Luchon to Perpignan,

Stage 8
13 July 1919 — Perpignan to Marseille,

References

1919 Tour de France
Tour de France stages